Ramli is a surname. Notable people with the surname include:

 Khayr al-Din al-Ramli, Islamic jurist
 Mohd Hatta Ramli, Malaysian politician
 Mohd Zamri Ramli, Malaysian footballer
 Muhsin al-Ramli, Iraqi writer
 Rizal Ramli, Indonesian politician

Arabic-language surnames